The Purdue Fort Wayne Mastodons, formerly known as the IPFW Mastodons and Fort Wayne Mastodons, are the intercollegiate athletic teams that represent Purdue University Fort Wayne (PFW). The school's athletic program includes 16 varsity sports teams. Their mascot is a Mastodon named Don, and the school colors are black and gold.  The university participates in the NCAA's Division I as members of the Horizon League in all varsity sports except for men's volleyball, which competes in the Midwestern Intercollegiate Volleyball Association. Purdue Fort Wayne offers 8 varsity sports for men and 8 for women.

History

IPFW
At the start of athletics competition, the school was known as the abbreviation for Indiana University – Purdue University Fort Wayne (IPFW). In 1968 a large bone was discovered during the installation of a farm pond near Angola, Indiana, about 40 miles (65 km) north of Fort Wayne. The farmer contacted professors in the IPFW geology department, who identified his discovery as the leg bone of a mastodon. Faculty and students from the geology department excavated the greater part of an adult mastodon, including the skull and tusks. The bones were cleaned, preserved, and placed on permanent display at IPFW. In 1970 members of the geology club, led by professors who oversaw the excavation, successfully lobbied the student government committee charged with choosing a name for the university mascot to select the mastodon. And thus, the IPFW Mastodons were born [9]. In addition to serving as a mascot, “Mastodon” is used as the athletic moniker for team members and school-spirited references to the student body. The selection of the mastodon as mascot—as well as a tongue-in-cheek borrowing of the term “Don” from its academic British English use—lends itself to be a suffix to refer to the athletics teams as well, such as Volleydons for the volleyball teams. In a related reference, the Mastodon STOMP pep band instills school spirit among the fans during home matches and games. By using the nickname "Mastodons", Purdue Fort Wayne is one of the few schools to use an extinct organism as a nickname, along with the Amherst Mammoths and the Maranatha Baptist Sabercats.

When the school first fielding athletics, they competed as an NCAA Division III Independent. In the summer of 1981, the Mastodons made a jump to NCAA Division II where they remained independent. Prior to the 1984–85 school year, the Mastodons joined the Great Lakes Valley Conference, their first ever conference affiliation. At the start of the 2001–02 academic year, the Mastodons joined NCAA Division I as an independent. IPFW joined their first Division I conference in July, 2007, joining The Summit League.

IPFW was reorganized in the mid-2010s, eventually splitting into Indiana University Fort Wayne and Purdue University Fort Wayne. One of the first aspects of the action was the closure of the tennis teams at the end of the 2015 academic year. The teams had won Summit League regular season (Men's: 2012; Women's: 2009, 2010, 2011, 2013) and tournament (Women's 2010, 2011, 2013) championships.

Fort Wayne 
On August 8, 2016, shortly before the start of the 2016–17 school year, IPFW athletic director Kelley Hartley Hutton announced that effective immediately, "Fort Wayne" would be the university's exclusive athletic brand. The school's "IPFW" academic branding was not affected. The Summit League has called the athletic program "Fort Wayne" since 2012, in line with a conference initiative to use geographic names to describe metropolitan campuses such as IPFW. When the school announced the athletic brand change, it noted,Some Mastodon teams have already been using Fort Wayne on uniforms since this recommendation, but the use has been limited and resulted in some confusion. Outside of northeast Indiana, there is also considerable confusion about the "IPFW" acronym, with misnomers being common—even among those involved in Division I athletics.

Purdue Fort Wayne 
Indiana University and Purdue University in Fort Wayne officially separated on July 1, 2018, with IU taking responsibility for IPFW's degree programs in health sciences and Purdue retaining all other academic programs. Thereafter, the Mastodons will represent Purdue University Fort Wayne. With the name change, the school's colors will change from Royal Blue and White to the Old Gold and Black used by the other three Purdue University campuses. On June 18, 2018, the school announced that beginning July 1, 2018 all NCAA sports teams will be known as the Purdue Fort Wayne Mastadons. In addition, a new logo was revealed where the color blue has been incorporated as a secondary color to the university's official school colors of gold and black.

Because NCAA rules bar players from two different schools from competing on the same team, future IU Fort Wayne students will not be eligible for Mastodons athletics. At the time the separation was announced, five of the roughly 240 Fort Wayne varsity athletes were in academic majors that would become part of the new IU Fort Wayne campus, with three possibly requiring NCAA waivers to remain athletically eligible.

The school joined the Horizon League from the Summit League in July 2020. At that time, media also noted that PFW's longest road trip in the Horizon League (344 miles to Green Bay) would be shorter than its shortest Summit League trip (367 miles to Western Illinois).

Sports sponsored

Purdue Fort Wayne has 16 NCAA Division I varsity teams: 8 varsity sports for men and 8 for women. The men's volleyball team is a member of the Midwestern Intercollegiate Volleyball Association. The newest Mastodons sports are men's indoor and outdoor track & field, reinstated in 2019–20 after having been dropped by IPFW in 2005.

Baseball

Men's basketball 

Before joining NCAA Division I athletics, Fort Wayne competed in the Great Lakes Valley Conference in some sports in the NCAA Division II, where in 1993, the men's basketball team led, by brothers Sean and Shane Gibson, achieved the ranking of No. 4 in the country in NCAA Division II competition. Dane Fife was named the IPFW men's basketball head coach during summer 2005. Fife, who left after the 2010–11 season, was the youngest NCAA Division I head coach at the time of his appointment, at the age of 26. Tony Jasick replaced Fife as the head coach. Jon Coffman is the current head coach of the program, announced on April 10, 2014.

Women's basketball

Venues 
During its existence as IPFW, it hosted the 2000 NCAA Men's Volleyball Championship matches at the Allen County War Memorial Coliseum, which is adjacent to the campus. Most athletic events are held in the Hilliard Gates Sports Center or the Athletics Center Fieldhouse on the PFW campus.

Club sports

Men's ice hockey 
The IPFW Club Men's Ice Hockey Team is in its sixth season as a program and competes in the ACHA's North Region. IPFW has had recent success finishing in the top 20 in the nation the last three seasons. This past season the Mastodons won the Big Ten Club Tournament championship hosted by Northwestern University. This was a huge win for the program with bigger schools such as Iowa, Nebraska, Northwestern, Northern Illinois and No. 3 ranked University of Michigan-Flint also in the tournament. The Dons play their home games at Lutheran Health SportCenter and have for the past 2 seasons. IPFW used to play their games at the old McMillan Ice Arena.

Footnotes

References

External links
 

 
Midwestern Intercollegiate Volleyball Association